Family Without a Name is an 1889 adventure novel by Jules Verne about the life of a family in Lower Canada (present-day Quebec) during the Lower Canada Rebellion of 1837 and 1838 that sought an independent and democratic republic for Lower Canada. In the book, the two sons of a traitor fight in the Rebellion in an attempt to make up for the crime of their father.

Plot

Publication history
1889, USA, New York: J.W. Lovell Co, Pub date 1889; first United States edition, as A Family Without a Name
1889, USA, New York: Munro, Pub date 1889; as A Family Without a Name
1890, UK, London: Sampson Low, Pub date 1890; first UK edition, as A Family Without a Name
1963, UK, London: Arco, Pub date 1963; abridged and edited by I.O. Evans in 2 volumes as Leader of the Resistance and Into the Abyss
1982, Canada, Toronto: NC Press , Pub date 1982; new translation by Edward Baxter

Popular culture 
The 1978 edition, published at the French publishing house of the Union générale d'éditions, displayed upon the cover the mention "Pour un Québec libre" (For a Free Quebec). This was a decade after the Vive le Québec libre speech of French President Charles de Gaulle, two years after the first election of a contemporary independence party in Quebec, the Parti Québécois, and two years before their promised referendum on independence occurred in 1980. Lévesque had also made an important state visit to France a year before.

External links

Pictures of various elaborate book covers of the novel.

1889 French novels
Novels by Jules Verne
Lower Canada Rebellion fiction
Fiction set in 1837
Fiction set in 1838